Clara Amoateng Benson popularly known as Maame Serwaa is a young Ghanaian actress and brand ambassador. In April 2018, she was featured in BBC Africa’s documentary on the Thriving Ghanaian Movie Industry. She has also won several awards including Kumawood Best Actress of the Year 2015 and Ghana Tertiary Awards Best Actress of the Year 2018.

Education 
Benson was born in Kumasi. She was born on 19 August 2000 to Rose Benson and Opanyin Kwabena Nyame. In 2017, she completed her secondary level education at Serwaa Nyarko Girls' Senior High School. And then was awarded a four-year degree scholarship to study at the Knutsford University College located in East Legon, Accra.

Career 
Benson started her acting career at the age of 6 and has since starred in several movies earning her over 10 years experience in the Ghana movie industry. In 2018, she signed a five-year management deal with Silvanus Records. She is currently the brand ambassador for Knutsford University College.

Filmography 
She has starred in several movies including:

 Me Ba
 School Girl
 Sekina
 Tumi
 Ntaafo Tumi
 Otan Ne Bayie
 Maame Serwaa Asuoden
 Bayie Economy
 My Mother My Jewel
 Maame Serwaa Amanehunu
 Maame Serwaa in Love
 Merciful Satan
 Obofo Maame Serwaa
 Maame Serwaa Time Aso
 Who Killed Maame Serwaa
 Akokoa
 Few Good Men
 Nnipa Sei Nnipa
 Seed Of Rejection
 Medimafo Tease

Awards 
In 2018, she was honoured by University of Cape Coast. She has won several other awards which includes: 
|-
|| 2015  ||| Clara Benson || Best Indigenous Actress of the Year (City People Entertainment Awards ) ||  
|-
|| 2018  ||| Clara Benson || Best Actress of the Year (Ghana Tertiary Awards) ||  
|-
|| 2018  ||| Clara Benson || Student of the Year (Ghana Tertiary Awards) ||  
|-
|| 2018  ||| Clara Benson || Student Entrepreneur of the Year (Ghana Tertiary Awards) ||  
|-
|| 2018  ||| Clara Benson || Student Foundation of the Year (Ghana Tertiary Awards) ||  
|-

|| 2019  ||| Clara Benson || The Legendary Award (Ghana Film Summit 2019) ||  
|-
|}

References

Living people
21st-century Ghanaian actresses
2000 births